This is a list of characters from the visual novel School Days and its adaptations. Most of the characters and their birthdays are named after Japanese Prime Ministers.

Characters

Primary characters

 (credited as Tatsuya Hirai in game)
Makoto Ito is the protagonist of the School Days visual novel and its adaptations. He's the unlikely antagonist in the Cross Days manga. A generally mild-mannered and composed student in year one (10th grade), class three, his life becomes complicated when Sekai Saionji sets him up with Kotonoha Katsura, a girl he has a crush on.

Soon afterwards, Sekai decides to kiss him at a train station where he is waiting on Kotonoha for their first date. From this point onwards, Makoto's personality can change drastically depending on the player's decisions in the visual novel, and he can become anything from a mostly decisive and faithful partner to one of his love interests, to an indecisive and/or selfish and cruel person who unfaithfully initiates multiple relationships and, in the bad endings, pays a heavy price for it. In almost all VN routes and adaptations, he is good friends with his best friend Taisuke Sawanaga and Otome Katou (the latter of whom is a childhood friend), and lives with his divorced mother and has a younger sister named Itaru who lives with their father.

His anime incarnation, though initially casual, gentle and understanding, gets addicted to sex over time and instead becomes more apathetic, rash and egotistical towards others, regardless of interpersonal harm or later consequence. It is hinted on multiple occasions that he is aware of the negative consequences of his actions, but makes no real attempt to remedy them. This version of Makoto is seen as callous and selfish, and has been negatively received by multiple critics and fans of the original visual novel alike. In the final episode, he is killed by a jealous and emotionally unstable Sekai, who stabs him to death for being unfaithful to her with Kotonoha. Kotonoha, having lost her sanity upon seeing Makoto's corpse, kills Sekai in return. Makoto, when portrayed in the manga, is much more reserved and controlled, and even struggles choosing over Sekai and Kotonoha. In the final two chapters of the manga, Makoto is accidentally slashed by a maddened Kotonoha, who immediately breaks down in remorse. After being admitted to a hospital, Makoto announces to Sekai that he shall live with Kotonoha to help ease her spirits, only to discover later on that Sekai fatally stabbed Kotonoha so as to prevent her from harming Makoto further, much to his horror. His birthday and his surname are derived from Itō Hirobumi. Makoto's given name means "fidelity" and or "truth" which can be ironic. He is considered a generic protagonist since he is a gentle ordinary high school student. Although not directly stated, it is implied that his father is Tomaru Sawagoe (a character who appeared in other 0verlfow games), a fact which is proven through external sources.

 (credited as Soyogi Tono in game)
Shy and reserved, Kotonoha Katsura is a student in year one, class four who is on the student council and serves as one of the most pivotal characters in the story. A sweet girly girl and noticeably well-endowed bookworm, she becomes the initial love interest of Makoto early into their second term, and with some effort from Sekai Saionji, becomes his girlfriend after she reciprocates her affection for him. While Kotonoha for the most part is shy and gentle, she has a very delicate psyche, which under stress can lead to irrational culpability, delusions and even malice. Hence, she is a well known yandere character. She has a younger sister named Kokoro and lives with their wealthy mother Manami and father in the fictional area of Haramihama. She is disliked by Otome Katou and is subject to her bullying on account of her beauty, among other reasons.

In the anime, she becomes insane from her love for Makoto, her desperation to keep him, and her knowledge of his unfaithfulness to her. Makoto realizes how much he had hurt Kotonoha, and, overwhelmed by remorse, takes her back as his girlfriend. Tragically, the next day, Kotonoha soon discovers Makoto had been killed; correctly deducing a jealous Sekai had murdered him, she lops off Makoto's head and presents it to Sekai seconds before murdering her in revenge. She is later seen lovingly cuddling Makoto's severed head on a boat facing the sunrise. In the manga, she accidentally slashes Makoto in an attempt to kill a luring Sekai, who, in order to prevent her from harming Makoto further, kills her while Makoto recovers in a hospital. Her birthday and her surname are derived from Katsura Tarō.

 (credited as Kaname Yuzuki in game)
Sekai Saionji is a student in year one, class three who is the antithesis and foil of Kotonoha. Tomboyish, playful kogyaru classmate seated directly next to Makoto, she takes a curious interest in him during their first acquaintance, and in every medium of the series, helps to establish his bond with Kotonoha. Though a happy girl, Sekai does occasionally show a more serious side, and when sufficiently frustrated can be loud, selfish, overemotional and even manipulative. She lives with her mother Yōko in the fictional area of Motehara-Sakashita and works part-time as a waitress at the family restaurant Radish.

In the anime, she attempts to set up Makoto and Kotonoha in a relationship, but ultimately ends up falling in love with Makoto. Makoto, bored with Kotonoha, decides to go after Sekai, who he supposedly impregnates after making love to her. Makoto, stressed and confused as to what to do about Sekai's pregnancy, leaves Sekai for Kotonaha, who he discovers to have been emotionally devastated by his cheating on her. Sekai then stabs Makoto to death for his unfaithfulness to her, only for Kotonoha to kill her in return, after she accuses Sekai of faking her pregnancy. Once Sekai is dead, Kotonoha claims her suspicions were accurate. In the manga, Kotonoha very nearly kills her for luring Makoto away from her, but accidentally slashes Makoto himself, who gets admitted to a hospital. Sekai, having become insane from the shock of nearly being killed, fatally stabs Kotonoha in order to prevent her from harming Makoto further. Her birthday and her surname are derived from Saionji Kinmochi. It's revealed in the Summer Days game that Sekai's mother is the daughter of Makoto's father (that makes her Makoto's 'half-sister'), so Makoto is Sekai's uncle.

Secondary characters

 (credited as Hana Yamamoto in game)
Setsuna Kiyoura is a student in year one, class three, who likes Makoto, is on the student council as a class representative. One of the more inscrutable characters, Setsuna is a keen, focused and habitually tacit girl who tends to have and keep the most level head of her peers when situations go awry. Setsuna is a silent and emotionless kuudere who is very stoic in tone and expression. She is Sekai's best friend, having grown up with her, and to a considerable degree is overly solicitous of her, to the point of hurting others to ensure that Sekai is happy. In Summer Days, where she is the protagonist, Setsuna is shy and timid, in contrast to her more serious portrayal in School Days. Her mother, Mai, only makes an appearance in Summer Days. With the exception of Kokoro Katsura, Setsuna is the shortest character of the main cast, and is often mistaken for a junior high school student, a trait she is well aware and conscious of. Her birthday and her surname are derived from Kiyoura Keigo. In the anime, she is forced to leave for France, but, fearing for Sekai, who she knows to be emotionally unstable, places her in the hands of Makoto, who she orders to stay faithful to Sekai. It is soon revealed that Setsuna actually had a crush on Makoto. Her transferring to France, coupled with Makoto's subsequent unfaithfulness to Sekai, left Sekai in a deep emotional depression. It's revealed in the Summer Days game that Setsuna's mother, like Sekai's mother, is the daughter of Makoto's father (that makes her another 'half-sister' of Makoto), so Makoto is Setsuna's uncle, too.

 (credited as Hikaru Isshiki in game)
High maintenance or fastidious and tomboyish, Hikari Kuroda is a student in year one, class three, recognizable by her signature squid rings hairstyle. She initially believes that Makoto and Sekai are dating from the very start, and tends to negatively generalize him; later growing closer to him herself. Though she is actually quite friendly and social, Hikari is the most childish of the cast; sporting an unduly knack for whining and prying into the affairs of others. Her family owns a confectionery store and café, famous for its lemon custard pie. Hikari is good friends with Sekai and has an unreciprocated crush on Taisuke Sawanaga. Her birthday and her surname are derived from Kuroda Kiyotaka. In the anime, she grew out of her crush on Taisuke, and began having a sexual relationship with Makoto.

 (credited as Miko Fujimura in game)
Nanami Kanroji is a student in year one, class three who is a member of the girls' basketball team, attending the school on an athletic scholarship. A mostly interpersonal character, Nanami is a mature and silent tomboy who generally does not involve herself in the affairs of others and as such remains for the most part unanalyzed. She is the only girl of the main cast to have an established boyfriend from the start, a member of the basketball club named Kyoichi, though to her chagrin he is a devout otaku. Nanami is good friends with Sekai, who comes from her junior high school, and Otome Katou. Of the entire cast, Nanami is the tallest character. Her surname is derived from Kanroji Osanaga.

 (credited as Yuki Matsunaga in game)
Direct and headstrong, Otome Katou is a student in year one, class four, who like Nanami, is a member of the girls' basketball team. She is usually very intimidating, authoritative to her peers, tolerates nothing but her way and opinion, and does not generally associate with anyone but her trio of friends Minami Obuchi, Natsumi Koizumi and Kumi Mori; who together frequently harass and coerce Kotonoha. Despite her difficult behavior and tsundere personality however, Otome can be particularly tender and shy, especially around Makoto, who she has known since junior high school and has a crush on. Because she is very much a tomboy Makoto saw her as 'one of the guys' and took her confession as a joke. Apparently Otome has a younger sister named Karen, who appears in Shiny Days. Her birthday and her surname is derived from Katō Tomosaburō.

 (credited as Hikage Hinata in game)
Taisuke Sawanaga is a student in year one, class three. A spirited, peculiar, perverted and rather hopeless romantic, Taisuke is Makoto's best friend from junior high school who frequently endeavors to forward his otherwise lonely ambitious love life, oblivious to Hikari's feelings for him. He takes a strong interest in Kotonoha, despite her rejection, and only under certain circumstances in the game actually dates her. Though Taisuke raped Kotonoha or Sekai, the VN suggests he is somehow unaware how wrong rape is. Taisuke is the second tallest character of the cast, and is the only other male character besides Makoto.

 (credited as Aoi Kamitsuki)
Kokoro Katsura is the sweet-natured younger sister of Kotonoha. Unlike her older sibling, Kokoro is peppy, talkative and full of curiosity, and although she frequently teases Kotonoha, she worries about her greatly. She has a good friend named Uzuki and affectionately looks up to Makoto as her older brother. Kokoro lives with Kotonoha and their mother Manami and father. Her birthday and her surname are derived from Katsura Taro.

 (games), Megu Ashiro (anime)
Youko Saionji, maiden name Inō, is Sekai's mother. Benevolent, knowledgeable, wise and effervescent, Yōko serves to provide advice and guidance to her daughter when necessary, especially concerning her relationships. She is a restaurateur of Radish with friend, and slight rival, Mai Kiyoura. She is one of the heroines in Summer Days and Shiny Days. Her father is Tomaru Sawagoe (a character who appeared in other 0verlfow games), that makes her 'half-sister' of Makoto, so Makoto is Youko's younger brother.

 (games), Shiho Hisajima (anime)
Manami Katsura is the biological mother of Kotonoha and Kokoro who makes vocal appearances in the game and anime and a brief appearance in one panel of the manga. She is one of the heroines in Summer Days and Shiny Days. She also appear in Cross Days.

Summer Days characters

: (credited as Mio Okawa in game)
Ai Yamagata is a student in year one, class three. She is good friends with Sekai Saionji and Hikari Kuroda, and is an acquaintance of Makoto Itou and Otome Katou from middle school. She also appears in Cross Days and School days, makes a cameo appearance in episode 2 . Her birthday and her surname are derived from Yamagata Aritomo.

: (credited as GUNTA in game)
Karen Katou is the playful younger sister of Otome Katou. Unlike her older sibling, Karen is cheerful and unabashed who is just as playfully teasing as she is concerned of Otome. She is good friends with Kazuha and Futaba Nijou and looks up to Makoto as her mentor and role model.

 (credited as Aoi Kamitsuki in game)
 Kazuha Nijou is the older monozygotic twin of Futaba Nijou, distinguishable by her red headband and sailor outfit school uniform. She is a classmate and good friend of Karen who looks up to Makoto as her mentor and role model.

: (credited as Yayoi Kusatsuki)
 Futaba Nijou is the younger monozygotic twin of Kazuha, distinguishable by her beige headband and dressy clothes. Like her sister, Futaba is a fellow classmate and good friend of Karen who looks up to Makoto as her mentor and role model.

:
 Employed waitress of Radish. Oruha Hashimoto initially does not like Setsuna and teases her with ridicule and put-downs, but eventually grows to accept her. She is a good friend of Noan Murayama. Of the entire female cast, Oruha is the only girl with an established boyfriend from the start.

:
 The second waitress of Radish, Noan Murayama is roughly the same as Oruha, though she is more gentle and easygoing. Setsuna looks up to her as a role model. Her birthday and her surname are derived from Murayama Tomiichi.

:
 Mai Kiyoura, maiden name Inō, is Setsuna's mother. She is a restaurateur with friend, and slight rival, Youko Saionji. Her father is Tomaru Sawagoe, which makes her another 'half-sister' of Makoto, so Makoto is Mai's younger brother, too.

:
Shun is the father of Sekai, Setsuna, Hanon, Kazuha, Futaba, Roka, and Inori. Like Youko and Mai, his father is Tomaru Sawagoe, that makes him 'half-brother' of Makoto, so Makoto is Shun's younger brother.

Cross Days characters

:
 Reserved and slightly bashful, Yuuki Ashikaga is the unlikely protagonist of the game. Yuuki is friends with Taisuke Sawanaga and Hikari Kuroda. Although confident and bright, due to his short height and bespectacled nature, he suffers from an inferiority complex and is easily manipulated, especially by his older sister Chie. Yuuki enjoys reading, playing MMOs and looks up to Kyouichi Kasannoin as his mentor and senpai. A student librarian in year one, class one, his life at school becomes tangled and confusing when he inquires about and attempts to resolve, a supposed affair between Roka Kitsuregawa and Makoto Itou, boyfriend of Kotonoha Katsura. In the manga, despite his efforts in exposing Makoto's unfaithfulness to Kotonoha, whom he has a crush on, Yuuki is greatly distraught when he discovers Kotonoha's insanity as she scolds him coldly for "interfering with [her] life". A despondent Yuuki considers suicide on a monorail, Roka, in the nick of time saves and reassures him. At the school festival, after Makoto gets shamed by his classmates for mocking Yuuki, Setsuna convinces Yuuki and Roka not to approach Makoto and Kotonoha ever again. Yuuki and Roka become a couple. His name is derived from the Ashikaga clan.

 is the feminine pseudonym that Yuuki assumes when he cross-dresses as a female student.

:
 Roka Kitsuregawa is a student in year one, class two who is a member of the woman's basketball team and serves as the heroine of the story. Tender and friendly, she comes upon Yuuki in the school library, and, following a more developed acquaintance through his sister Chie, becomes attracted to him. Like Yuuki, Roka herself is also short and petite, standing roughly his height and equally as intimidated and timid. She is friends with Chie, Ion Ishibashi, and Youka Kira. In the manga, Roka initially relied on Makoto to mend her relationship with Yuuki, which unwittingly caused a misunderstood affair. Her actions to make Yuuki jealous are vain as she is oblivious of Makoto's callous nature while Yuuki (cross-dressing) alone aims to solve the unpredictable events. Only when Makoto tried to rape her, and Yuuki rescues her, Roka comes to realize her mistake. After saving Yuuki from certain death, Roka learned to be more straightforward and has him invite and accept her feelings at the school festival bonfire dance.

:
 Willful yet caring, Chie Ashikaga is the older sister of Yuuki who, like Roka, is a member of the woman's basketball team. She introduces her brother to Roka at the beginning of the game, initiating the first love triangle of characters and the basis to what eventually becomes a misunderstood affair between Roka and Makoto. Chie is good friends with Ion, Youka and is jealous of Nanami Kanroji's athleticism. Though very brief, Chie, with much shorter hair, makes a cameo appearance in episode 10 of School Days, as the student responsible for videotaping the activity of the rest area during the school festival. Her name is derived from the Ashikaga clan.

:
 Ion Ishibashi is a student and a member of the woman's basketball team. She is an androgynous friend of Chie who also smokes. Her name is derived from Tanzan Ishibashi.

:
 Passive and sagacious, Youka Kira is a student. She is a friend of Chie who also smokes. Her surname is derived from Yoshinaka Kira.

:
 Kyouichi Kasannoin is a student in year one, class one, and Nanami Kanroji's boyfriend. He enjoys playing eroges, works part-time as a tutor and looks to Yuuki as his kōhai. He also makes a cameo appearance in episode 10 of School Days, 

 Tsutsumi Shibukawa is a student in year three, and captain of the girls' basketball team. She used to be friends with Yuuki's sister Chie, but Tsutsumi's attempts to ban the "break rooms" put a strain on their friendship. Her surname is derived from Shunkai Shibukawa.

:
 The older sister of Kazuha and Futaba Nijou. She is from Watojo Academy and is often seen visiting Sakakino with Niki Ookuma, her best friend. Unknown to everyone, Hanon is one of the "other women" of Kyouichi Kasannoin. Like Ai Yamagata, Hanon also went to the same middle school with Makoto and is rumoured to have fallen for him as well. She is popular with male students from other schools and is rumoured to have sex with minors. Hanon doesn't get along with Otome Katou but gets along fine with Otome's little sister Karen Katou.

:
 The childhood friend of Sekai and Setsuna. Unlike both of them, she went to Watojo Academy. She is also friends with Hanon Nijou. Niki Oogura is an alias she has sometimes used. In one route in Cross Days, Niki will attempt to seduce Yuuki but failed. Her surname is possibly derived from Ōkuma Shigenobu.

 Ruka Imagawa is a classmate of protagonist Yuuki Ashikaga and a friend and basketball teammate of Roka Kitsuregawa. She is usually seen in the company of Mugi Hatakeyama and Natsuki Hosokawa. Her name may be derived from the Imagawa clan.

 Natsuki Hozokawa is one of Yuuki Ashikaga's classmates and Roka Kitsuregawa's friends, as well as a member of the girls' basketball team. She's often seen in the company of Ruka Imagawa and Mugi Hatakeyama. She's also Oruha Hashimoto's younger sister but has a different surname due to their parents' divorce many years ago. Her name may be derived from the Hosokawa clan.

 Mugi Hatayama is a classmate of Yuuki Ashikaga and a friend and basketball teammate of Roka Kitsuregawa. She is usually seen in the company of Ruka Imagawa and Natsuki Hosokawa. Her name may be derived from the Hatakeyama clan.

 Kyomi Kasannoin is the sister of Kyouichi Kasannoin. She has a huge brother complex. She was only mentioned in School Days, and make her appearance in Cross Days. According to Nanami, she is described to be cute.

 Yae Kanroji is the sister of Nanami Kanroji and a classmate of Kokoro Katsura at cram school.

Shiny Days characters

 Inori Ashikaga is a girl who bumps into Setsuna on her first day at Radish Restaurant. After being knockout by Setsuna(for accidentally stripping her uniform), she is looked after by her. She is the long lost childhood friend of Makoto.

 Natsuhi is the biological mother of Inori.

 Moeko is the mother of Makoto and Itaru.

Minor characters

 Minami Obuchi is a student in class four who is the most obedient friend of Otome and bullies Kotonoha. Her name and birthday are derived from Keizo Obuchi.

 (games), Nana Furuhara (anime)
 Natsumi Koizumi is a student in class four who is the most informative and interpersonal friend of Otome and bullies Kotonoha. Her name and birthday are derived from Junichiro Koizumi.Voiced by: Nene (games), Eri Saita (anime)
 Kumi Mori is a student in class four who is the most puerile, yet politest friend of Otome. In the anime, it is mentioned that she has a boyfriend. Kumi also bullies Kotonoha. Her name and birthday are derived from Yoshiro Mori.

 (games), Emi Uwagawa (Drama CD vol. 1)
 Wholesome, carefree and overall cheerful, Itaru is the younger sister of Makoto. Separated by the divorce of their parents, she lives under the sole custody of their father, who she does not like, and occasionally sneaks out to come and visit her much-adored older brother. Her favourite food is peach.Voiced by: Ryuusaku Chidiwa (anime), Takezou Koike (Cross Days)
 Tanaka is a student at Sakakino High, and the Male Class Representative of Class 1-3. Tanaka is unusually tall; this is highlighted by the way the top of the screen cuts off around the level of his shoulders, so his face is never seen. He is not much of a speaker; what little he does say is conveyed in grunts that the characters can understand but the player cannot. In School Days, it is mentioned Tanaka is in the Judo club.
 In one of the possible pathways and the anime before the school festival, he fractures his arm while training and Makoto takes his place as committee member.
 Tanaka has two forenames between two media; in the anime, he is known as Ichiro Tanaka (田中 郎, Tanaka Ichiro), and in Cross Days, he is known as Hisoka Tanaka (田中 密, Tanaka Hisoka'').
 His surname is likely derived from Tanaka Giichi, or Kakuei Tanaka.

References

Lists of anime and manga characters
Lists of visual novel characters